KRTV (channel 3) is a television station in Great Falls, Montana, United States, affiliated with CBS and The CW Plus. It is owned by the E. W. Scripps Company alongside KTGF-LD (channel 50), the local NBC affiliate, and is part of the Montana Television Network (MTN), a statewide network of CBS-affiliated stations. KRTV's studios and transmitter are located on Old Havre Highway in Black Eagle, just outside Great Falls.

In Helena, Montana, KRTV is repeated on a low-power semi-satellite, KXLH-LD (channel 9), which airs the same network and syndicated programming but with Helena-specific commercials and evening newscasts. KXLH-LD has studios on West Lyndale Avenue in Helena, shared with that city's NBC affiliate, KTVH-DT (channel 12). Master control and some internal operations of KXLH-LD are handled by KRTV in Great Falls.

KRTV was the second television station to sign on in Great Falls, doing so in 1958. Its purchase by Joe Sample in 1969 led to the foundation of MTN. From 1971 to 1984, the station was MTN's hub and produced statewide newscasts for air across the state. Since the 1990s, the station has generally been the Great Falls market leader for local news.

History

Early years and construction
After the Federal Communications Commission (FCC) opened applications for new television stations in 1952, it received three in Great Falls, two of them for channel 3 (and a third for channel 5, which became KFBB-TV). However, neither channel 3 proposal came to fruition. The Z-Bar Network filed for four stations across the state but abandoned its channel 3 application for Great Falls, while the competing applicant, Montana Farmer (owner of station KMON), withdrew its proposal in January 1954.

Interest in the second VHF channel for Great Falls returned on April 25, 1956, when the Cascade Broadcasting Company, owned by Robert and Francis Laird of San Luis Obispo, California, filed for channel 3. The Lairds were granted a construction permit on May 29, 1957. Dan Snyder was named manager, and construction began on the station's studios and transmitter facility on a hill overlooking Black Eagle. Plans were announced to go on the air as an independent station using local and filmed programs.

KRTV began broadcasting on June 27, 1958, at 6 p.m. The station would have an inauspicious start. A film projector failed, and once it was replaced, bigger trouble emerged. A storm with reported wind gusts of up to  moved through Great Falls that night and severely damaged the station's antenna. It became apparent that viewers would have to wait a while for KRTV to get the antenna repaired at the factory and reinstalled. The station placed a "short, short story" in the Great Falls Tribune about its plight, noting "We shall return! (P.S. Don't ask us when!)" While the station was silent, the Lairds filed to sell the station outright to Snyder. The station returned to the air on the afternoon of October 5. That day, an ad in the Tribune declared they'd be on the air "if the wind doesn't topple our tower again".

NBC affiliation and color programming
Two years later, Paul Crain, owner of KUDI (1450 AM), bought a 26 percent stake in KRTV. It secured a full-time network affiliation with NBC later that year; the month before, in time for the World Series, Western Microwave completed a second microwave path to carry network programs from Salt Lake City to Great Falls.

In 1962, an addition to the studio building was completed that replaced the old studio with a new, larger space and reutilized the old one to house a new color-capable transmitter, permitting the station to increase its effective radiated power from 600 to 30,000 watts and air network programs in color; local color productions began five years later, making KRTV the state's first "full color" station. Crain died of a heart attack in 1964.

In February 1968, Harriscope, Inc., owner of KFBB-TV, opted to affiliate all of its stations with ABC. As a result, KRTV became the primary affiliate for CBS and NBC in the city.

Becoming part of MTN
Snyder reached a deal in October 1968 to sell KRTV to Garryowen Cascade TV, a company owned by Joe Sample. Sample already owned KOOK-TV in Billings and KXLF-TV in Butte. The acquisition gained FCC approval on a 4–3 vote over concerns that Sample would have an outsized influence on Montana television; one commissioner, Kenneth A. Cox, voted for the deal "reluctantly" because concerns over maintaining television service in rural areas outweighed economic concentration questions for him.

While no national network affiliations changed, the KRTV sale to Sample set off a realignment in Montana television nonetheless. KOOK-TV and KXLF-TV, along with KFBB-TV, were members of the Skyline Network, which provided its members with a microwave connection to Salt Lake City for network programs and also was an advertising sales representative. Affiliation and ownership changes at Skyline's outlets, which also included stations in Idaho, led to the network being dissolved on September 30, 1969. This resulted in the establishment of the Montana Television Network with KOOK-TV, KRTV, and KXLF-TV.

Great Falls became a link of outsized importance within the new MTN setup. At KRTV's studio site, feeds from across the state could be easily received. Thus, even though MTN was nominally based in Billings, Great Falls was chosen as the hub city when MTN began the production of a local-regional hybrid newscast in 1971. The MTN News consisted of 15 minutes of network news from Great Falls and another 15 minutes locally produced at each station. Today in Montana, a local talk show hosted by Norma Ashby since 1962, also began to air across the network. In 1973, a new studio facility was completed, and KRTV was upgraded to the maximum power of 100,000 watts.

Decline and recovery
In 1983, a 'burned out' Sample announced he would sell the Montana Television Network to George Lilly. One of Sample's last acts as owner of the Montana Television Network was to move the production of the MTN News from Great Falls to Billings in hopes of improving local news ratings in the state's largest city. Sample had concluded that viewers in Billings would rather hear about "the fender bender in Billings" than larger stories from elsewhere in the state. Further, the order of the newscast was changed to put the local inserts first. Format changes were also implemented for Today in Montana; Norma Ashby left the show after 23 years in 1985, and more news and weather from Billings was added, leading to its renaming as The Noon News in 1986.

The change had opposite effects in the two largest television markets in Montana. At the same time as the ownership and production changes, Ed Coghlan, who had been the Great Falls-based main anchor for MTN News, left for a job at KCOP-TV in Los Angeles and proceeded to hire away MTN's weather and sports presenters. This caused KRTV's news ratings to swoon; after several years with KRTV on top, KFBB-TV took the lead in the market and was able to market itself as a more local newscast than its competitor.

KRTV dropped NBC in 1984, when the entire MTN network switched to exclusive CBS affiliation. KRTV and KFBB-TV continued to air a limited number of NBC shows until the third station for Great Falls, KTGF (channel 16), started broadcasting in September 1986.

Cordillera ownership and EAS intrusion incident
In 1986, Evening Post Industries purchased the MTN stations outside of Billings, which Lilly continued to own for another eight years. Beginning in early 1987, first at 5:30 and then at 10 p.m., KRTV began originating its own full-length newscasts as the hybrid setup was wound down. By the end of the decade, KRTV had not only recovered but opened a wide lead over KFBB-TV in the Great Falls news ratings, a change attributed to the return of KRTV founding employee and later MTN executive Don Bradley from a short-lived attempt at station ownership in Helena to run the Great Falls station from 1988 to 1994.

In 2005, KRTV took over the operations of KXLH-LP in Helena, which had previously been a semi-satellite of KXLF-TV in Butte. KXLF-TV had been rebroadcast to Helena since 1969, when a translator of the Mining City station was established. In 2010, KXLH-LD started airing local newscasts for the Helena area produced from Great Falls using local reporters, separate anchor talent, and KRTV's weather and sports presenters. The newscasts quickly attracted considerable viewership.

On February 11, 2013, at approximately 2:33 p.m. MST, an unknown hacker reportedly gained access to the station's Emergency Alert System (EAS) encoder and sent out a Local Area Emergency, explaining in a pitch-altered voice that "the bodies of the dead are rising from their graves and attacking the living" and that the bodies were considered "extremely dangerous", apparently referencing The Walking Dead. The voice also asked viewers to tune to 920 AM—a frequency unused by any Great Falls station—for further information after the station ended operations. Within minutes, station staff informed the public of the system intrusion and that there was no emergency. A similar incident that night affected two television stations in Marquette, Michigan.

On the morning of February 12, DJs from WIZM-FM in La Crosse, Wisconsin, were discussing the KRTV EAS intrusion. As part of the segment, they aired an audio clip of the actual EAS intrusion (including the tones); this inadvertently led to WIZM-FM and La Crosse TV station WKBT-DT rebroadcasting the alert.

Scripps ownership
Scripps acquired 15 of the 16 stations owned by Cordillera Communications (the former Evening Post station group), including all of MTN, in 2019. In 2021, Scripps filed to switch all of the full-power MTN stations, including KRTV, from the VHF to the UHF band in order to improve reception; it has requested channel 22 for KRTV.

Technical information

Subchannels
The station's digital signal is multiplexed:

The difference in subchannels is because The CW is on a subchannel of KTVH-DT in Helena. Newsy is carried on KTVH's Great Falls semi-satellite, KTGF-LD, instead.

Analog-to-digital conversion
KRTV shut down its analog signal (VHF channel 3) on February 17, 2009, the original target date in which full-power television stations in the United States were to transition from analog to digital broadcasts under federal mandate (which was later pushed back to June 12, 2009). The station's digital signal remained on its pre-transition VHF channel 7.

Translators
In addition to KXLH-LD, KRTV has 19 other dependent translators in north-central and northern Montana.

 Big Sandy, Montana: K19JQ-D
 Chinook: K13OU-D
 Conrad: K18KM-D
 Denton: K12RE-D
 Dodson: K10FC-D
 Fort Peck: K22MN-D
 Glasgow: K09HY-D
 Havre: K09ZB-D
 Hinsdale: K10JK-D
 Joplin: K27JW-D
 Lewistown: K15LD-D
 Malta: K13GP-D
 Phillips County: K24MN-D
 Saco: K12FB-D
 Stanford: K11WK-D
 Sweetgrass: K25NJ-D
 Tampico: K30LC-D
 West Knees: K11WQ-D
 Whitewater: K11GX-D
 Wolf Point: K19JR-D

References

External links
 KRTV.com - Official KRTV website
 KXLH.com - Official KXLH-LD website
 TheCWGreatFalls.com - Official CW Great Falls Website 
 
 KRTV Records (University of Montana Archives)

Montana Television Network
CBS network affiliates
The CW affiliates
Grit (TV network) affiliates
Ion Television affiliates
Television channels and stations established in 1958
1958 establishments in Montana
RTV
E. W. Scripps Company television stations